is a Japanese actor best known for his role as Dan Moroboshi in Ultraseven.

Filmography

Films
The Music (1972)
Zero Fighter Burns (1984)
Furimukeba Ai (1984)
Robot Carnival (1987) - Protagonist in "Presence" segment
Ultraman Zearth (1996-1997) – Ban Satsuma
Ultraman Mebius & Ultraman Brothers (2006) – Dan Moroboshi/Ultra Seven
Superior Ultraman 8 Brothers (2008) – Dan Moroboshi/Ultra Seven
Persona (2008)
Ultraman Mebius Side Story: Ghost Reverse (2009) – Ultra Seven (voice)
Mega Monster Battle: Ultra Galaxy (2009) – Dan Moroboshi/Ultra Seven
Ultraman Zero: The Revenge of Belial (2010) – Ultra Seven (voice)
Ultraman Zero: Killer The Beat Star (2011) – Ultra Seven (voice)
Ultraman Saga (2012) – Dan Moroboshi/Ultra Seven
Ultraman Orb: I'm Borrowing the Power of Your Bonds! (2017) - Dan Moroboshi/Ultra Seven
Summer Blooms (2018)
Soreike! Gateball Sakura-gumi (2023)

TV Drama
Ultra Seven (1967) – Dan Moroboshi/Ultra Seven, Jiro Satsuma (ep 17)
Ten to Chi to (1969) – Hōjō Ujimasa (Taiga drama)
Utsukushiki Challenger (1971) – Akihisa Takamine
Ultraman Leo (1974) – Captain Dan Moroboshi (ep 1-40, 51)
Kusa Moeru (1979) as Hatakeyama Shigetada
Akō Rōshi (1979) – Maehara Isuke
Tokugawa Ieyasu (1983)
Taiheiki (1991) – Hosokawa Akiuji
Kamen Rider Blade (2004) – Hiroshi Tennōji (ep 38 - 46)/Kerberos II (ep 46)
Ultra Fight Orb (2017) – Ultra Seven (voice)

Guest appearance
The Return of Ultraman (1971) – Dan Moroboshi/Ultra Seven (ep 38)
Nemuri Kyōshirō (1972) (ep12)
Hissatsu Shiokinin (1973) (ep16)
Ultraman Taro (1973) – Dan Moroboshi/Ultra Seven (ep 33, 34)
Shin Hissatsu Shiokinin (1977) (ep33)
Hissatsu Shigotonin (1980) (ep70)
Ultraman Max (2005) – Dr. Takeru Ozaki (ep 19)
Ultraman Mebius (2007) – Dan Moroboshi/Ultra Seven (ep 46, 50)
Ultraseven X (2007) – Dan Moroboshi (ep 12)
Downtown Rocket (2018) – Dan Moroboshi (ep 11)

Stage Shows
Ultraman Premium Stage 'Tears of the Starry Sky' (2007) – Dan Moroboshi
Ultraman Premium Stage II 'Star of Life' (2008) – Dan Moroboshi

References

External links

1943 births
20th-century Japanese male actors
21st-century Japanese male actors
Living people